The Judiciary of Armenia interprets and applies the laws of Armenia. Under the doctrine of the separation of powers, judiciary exercises judicial power separately from the legislative power of Parliament and executive power of the Prime Minister. Per the Constitution, it is defined with a hierarchical structure regulated by the Supreme Judicial Council of Armenia. On the other hand, The Ministry of Justice of Armenia is a government agency which possesses executive authority and executes policies of the Government of Armenia in sectors that are closely associated with laws and regulations.

Judiciary of Armenia

Based on article 7 of the Constitution of Armenia, judiciary in Armenia is exercised only by the courts through a three-tier judicial system, with the guarantor of its unrestricted implementation being the Supreme Judicial Council.

Constitutional Court of Armenia
In its turn, the Constitutional Court of Armenia is the highest legal body for constitutional review in Armenia. It is a judicial body which is separate and independent from the executive, the legislative and the judiciary. It is responsible for supervising the constitutionality of laws and other legislative instruments. The law of constitutional court of Armenia is defined both in Armenian constitution and in law.

Courts
The Supreme Judicial Council of Armenia is the guarantor of the unrestricted implementation of the judicial system. It consists of five distinguished members elected by the National Assembly, as well as five experienced judges elected by the general assembly of judges who forms the representative body of the judiciary.

Court of Cassation

The Court of Cassation of Armenia, based in the capital Yerevan covering the entire territory of Armenia.

Appellate Court
Known as the Court of Appeals of Armenia, including three types: Civil Court of Appeal, Criminal Court of Appeal, and Administrative Court of Appeal. The courts are based in the capital Yerevan and their jurisdiction covers the entire territory of the republic.

Trial courts
Known as the Courts of First Instance of General Jurisdiction of Armenia. Currently, there are 8 courts covering the 12 districts of the capital Yerevan, and 9 courts throughout the other 10 provinces of Armenia; one for each province, with the exception of Ararat and Vayots Dzor provinces which are directed by a single court based in Ararat province.

Specialized courts
Additionally, there are two types of Specialized Courts based in the capital Yerevan: Administrative court, and Bankruptcy court.

See also
 Politics of Armenia
 Legal system of Armenia

References

External links
 Judiciary of Armenia official website